Angel is the first album by the rock band Angel. "Tower", the keyboard-heavy opening track, was used widely during the late 1970s and early 1980s by album rock radio stations in the US for various advertising purposes. The track is also on K-SHE radio's Classic List. This album can be seen as representing the band's early progressive roots, with Helluva Band seeing the group starting to move towards an increasingly hard rock-oriented sound. Tracks 6-8 segue to form a 10-minute mini suite.

Track listing 
 "Tower" – 6:59 (Frank Dimino, Greg Giuffria, Punky Meadows)
 "Long Time" – 7:02 (Dimino, Giuffria, Meadows)
 "Rock and Rollers" – 4:01 (Dimino, Giuffria, Meadows)
 "Broken Dreams" – 5:15 (Dimino, Meadows)
 "Mariner" – 4:23 (Dimino, Giuffria, Big Jim Sullivan, Derek Lawrence)
 "Sunday Morning" – 4:10 (Dimino, Giuffria)
 "On & On" – 4:19 (Dimino, Giuffria, Meadows, Mickey Jones)
 "Angel (Theme)" – 1:39 (Giuffria, Barry Brandt)

Personnel 
 Frank DiMino - lead vocals
 Punky Meadows - lead and acoustic guitars
 Gregg Giuffria - organ, piano, clavinet, harpsichord, Mellotron, synthesizers, string ensemble
 Mickie Jones - bass guitar
 Barry Brandt - drums, percussion

Production
Arranged by Angel
Produced by Derek Lawrence and Big Jim Sullivan
Recording and mix by Peter Granet
Mastered at Allen Zentz Mastering
All songs published by White Angel Music.

References 

1975 debut albums
Angel (band) albums
Albums produced by Derek Lawrence
Casablanca Records albums
Albums recorded at Wally Heider Studios